Parectopa picroglossa is a moth of the family Gracillariidae. It is known from Sri Lanka.

References

Gracillariinae